Jean Patou (28 December 1878 – 1914) was a Belgian cyclist. He competed at the 1908 and 1912 Summer Olympics.

References

External links
 

1878 births
1914 deaths
Belgian male cyclists
Olympic cyclists of Belgium
Cyclists at the 1908 Summer Olympics
Cyclists at the 1912 Summer Olympics
Cyclists from Brussels